Einar Selvik (born 18 November 1979), also known by his stage name Kvitrafn ("white raven"), is a Norwegian musician known for being the drummer in the black metal band Gorgoroth from 2000 to 2004, and for fronting the Nordic folk project Wardruna, founded in 2002 and also including Gorgoroth's ex-vocalist Gaahl. Selvik and Wardruna's soundtrack work for the History Channel television show Vikings has earned him international prominence, and he also appeared as an actor on the show.

Musical career 
On 1 March 2016, A Piece for Mind & Mirror by Skuggsjá, a collaboration between Kvitrafn and Enslaved's Ivar Bjørnson, was announced and streamed. Prepared for the 200th anniversary of the Norwegian Constitution, the album tells the history of Norway, and was released by Season of Mist on 11 March.

Selvik has also recorded with other projects including Det Hedenske Folk, Bak de Syv Fjell, Jotunspor, Sahg, Dead to this World and Faun. Furthermore, he has worked on the soundtrack for Assassin's Creed Valhalla and with Riot Games for the theme song of "Volibear", a League of Legends character.

Personal life
Einar Selvik was born and grew up on Osterøy, a small inland island on the west coast of Norway around 35 minutes away by car from Bergen. He became interested in pre-Christian viking culture in his early adolescence after discovering an old book on runes.

Einar Selvik is an adherent of modern Paganism characterized by animism. In a 2017 interview with Morgenbladet, he talked about his worldview: "I am a strong supporter of individual responsibility. No one died for my sins. This is a slightly pagan body of thought: the gods help those who help themselves. It mirrors that you are your own god, that it is your responsibility how you behave, what you contribute in this world".

Discography

With Mortify
 Skuggerike demo (1995)

With Bak de Syv Fjell 
 Rehearsal demo (1996)	
 From Haavardstun EP (1997)

With Gorgoroth 
 Twilight of the Idols (2003)
 Black Mass Krakow 2004 (2008)

With Wardruna 
 Runaljod - Gap Var Ginnunga (2009)
 Runaljod - Yggdrasil (2013)
 Runaljod - Ragnarok (2016)
 Skald (2018)
 Kvitravn (2021)

With Jotunspor 
 Gleipnirs Smeder (2006)

With Sahg 
 I (2006)
 Domno Abyssus / Tyrant Empire (single) (2014)

With Dead to this World 
 First Strike for Spiritual Renewance (2007)

With Jesper Kyd and Sarah Schachner 
Assassin's Creed Valhalla: Out of the North (2020)
Assassin's Creed Valhalla: The Ravens Saga (2020)
Assassin's Creed Valhalla: The Weft of Spears (2020)

As Ivar Bjørnson and Einar Selvik 
 Skuggsjá (2016)
 Hugsjá (2018)

As Einar Selvik 
 Snake Pit Poetry (2017)
 Volibear, The Relentless Storm (2020) (Single)

References

External links
Artist page at Metal Archives
Artist page at Discogs

1979 births
Living people
Norwegian male singers
Norwegian singer-songwriters
Musicians from Bergen
Nordic folk musicians
Norwegian heavy metal drummers
Norwegian multi-instrumentalists
Norwegian rock drummers
Male drummers
Norwegian songwriters
Gorgoroth members
Sahg members
Norwegian modern pagans
Adherents of Germanic neopaganism
Performers of modern pagan music
21st-century Norwegian drummers